Chaoyang District is a core district of Beijing. It borders the districts of Shunyi to the northeast, Tongzhou to the east and southeast, Daxing to the south, Fengtai to the southwest, Dongcheng, Xicheng and Haidian to the west, and Changping to the northwest.

Chaoyang is home to the majority of Beijing's many foreign embassies, the well-known Sanlitun bar street, as well as Beijing's growing central business district. The Olympic Green, built for the 2008 Summer Olympics, is also in Chaoyang. Chaoyang extends west to Chaoyangmen on the eastern 2nd Ring Road, and nearly as far east as the Ximazhuang toll station on the Jingtong Expressway. Within the urban area of Beijing, it occupies , making it the central city's largest district, with Haidian second. As of November 2020, Chaoyang had a total population of 3,452,460, making it the most populous district in Beijing. The district has jurisdiction over 24 subdistrict offices and 19 area offices.
Chaoyang is also home to Silk Street, Bainaohui Computer Shopping Mall, Alien Street (老番街市场), and many other market areas, shopping malls, and restaurant strips.

Administrative divisions 
Chaoyang is divided into 24 subdistricts, and 19 townships of which carry the "area" label:

Government and infrastructure 

The Ministry of Foreign Affairs and the Ministry of Culture are headquartered in the district.

Economy 

In the year of 2022, the GDP of Chaoyang district was 791.12 billion yuan (＄117.62 billion by nominal), with GDP per capita at 229,843 yuan (＄34,172 by nominal).

China National Aviation Holdings Company (parent company of Air China), SOHO China, CITIC Group, Sinopec, Qihoo 360, COFCO, and Beijing Capital Airlines have their headquarters in Chaoyang District. Renren Inc. has its headquarters on the 23rd floor of the Jing An Center in Chaoyang District.

Wanda Group has its headquarters in the Wanda Plaza. Wanda Cinemas is headquartered in the same complex.

China Resources Beverage, the distributor of C'estbon water, has its north China regional office in the district.

Foreign companies
According to Chaoyang's official website, the district "is home to more than 60 percent of the foreign business agencies in Beijing, over 3,000 foreign companies, 167 international news agencies, and two-thirds of the 158 of the global top 500 transnational companies that have invested in Beijing." Some of these are:

ABB Group (China headquarters), Air France, All Nippon Airways, (Beijing Office, Beijing Fortune Building) Halliburton, IBM, KBR, Kerr-McGee China Petroleum Ltd. ( an Occidental Petroleum subsidiary), Korean Air (Hyundai Motor Tower), Kroll Inc., Lummus Technology, a subsidiary of CB&I, Lufthansa (Beijing Lufthansa Center), Asiana Airlines, Standard & Poor's, Swire Group, Etihad Airways, EVA Air, and Qatar Airways.

The Hong Kong-based company Swire Properties has two locations in Chaoyang.

Beijing Hyundai Motor Company, a 50–50 joint venture of the Beijing Automotive Industry Holding Co. and Hyundai Motor Company, has its sales offices in the Hyundai Motor Tower in Chaoyang District.

Embassies 
Chaoyang serves as Beijing's diplomatic district. All foreign embassies to China are located in the district except for that of Russia, which is in Dongcheng. Chaoyang has three embassy areas in the Sanlitun, Chaoyangmenwai, and Liangmahe neighborhoods.

Developments 

Chaoyang District is one of the fastest growing districts in the Beijing Metropolitan Area. There are several subway lines running through the district. The Beijing Capital Airport, although surrounded by the Shunyi District, is an exclave of Chaoyang District. The municipality as well as the Chinese national government spend almost a half million USD per day on developing this district.

Transport

Metro
Chaoyang is currently served by 14 metro lines of the Beijing Subway:

  – Jianguomen , Chaoyangmen 
  – Lishuiqiao , Lishuiqiao South, Beiyuanlu North, Datunlu East , Huixinxijie Beikou, Huixinxijie Nankou , Hepingxiqiao
  – Chaoyangmen , Dongdaqiao, Hujialou , Jintailu , Shilipu, Qingnianlu, Dalianpo, Huangqu, Changying, Caofang
  – Shuangjing , Jiulongshan , Dajiaoting, Baiziwan, Huagong, Nanlouzizhuang, Shuanghe, Jiaohuachang, Huang Chang, Lang Xin Zhuang, Hei Zhuang Hu
  – Lincuiqiao, South Gate of Forest Park, Olympic Green , Olympic Sports Center, Beitucheng , Anhuaqiao
  – Jiandemen, Beitucheng , Anzhenmen, Huixinxijie Nankou , Shaoyaoju , Taiyanggong, Sanyuanqiao , Liangmaqiao, Agricultural Exhibition Center, Tuanjiehu, Hujialou , Jintaixizhao, Guomao , Shuangjing , Jinsong, Panjiayuan, Shilihe, 
  – Lishuiqiao , Beiyuan, Wangjing West , Shaoyaoju , Guangximen, Liufang
  – Shilihe  , Beigongda Ximen, Jiulongshan , Dawanglu , Jintailu , Zaoying, Dongfengbeiqiao, Jiangtai, Wangjing South, Futong, Wangjing , Donghuqu, Laiguangying, Shangezhuang
  – Olympic Park , Anlilu, Datunlu East , Guānzhuang, Wangjingxi , Wangjing ,Wangjingdong, Cuigezhuang, Maquanying, Sunhe
  – Shilihe  , Zhoujiazhuang, Shibalidian
  – Sanyuanqiao , Terminal 2
  – Xiaocun, Xiaohongmen

Education

Tertiary academic institutions
 University of International Business and Economics (Beijing)
 Beijing International Studies University
 Communication University of China
 Beijing University of Technology

Public schools

 No.80 High School of Beijing
 RDFZ Chaoyang School
 RDFZ Chaoyang Branch School
 Beijing Ritan High School
 Beijing No. 17 High School

 Beijing Chen Jing Lun High School
 Beijing Hepingjie No.1 Middle School
 The High School Affiliated to Beijing University of Technology

International schools and kindergartens
 Hope International School of Beijing 
 Beijing BISS International School
 Yew Chung International School of Beijing
 Japanese School of Beijing
 Korean International School in Beijing (KISB), in Wangjing
 Harrow International School Beijing
 Canadian International School of Beijing
 Lycée Français International de Pekin (French school)
 Deutsche Botschaftsschule Peking (German school)
 Pakistan Embassy College Beijing
 Australian International School of Beijing
 Beijing World Youth Academy
 British School of Beijing Sanlitun Campus and Sanlitun Early Years Campus**
 Star Education Beijing
 The International Montessori School of Beijing Cherry Tree Lane Campus
 Beanstalk International Bilingual School
 Beijing City International School
 International Academy of Beijing Lido Campus and Ya Ao Campus
 Etonkids International Kindergarten

Notable areas 
 Beijing Central Business District (Beijing CBD)
 The China World Trade Center
 Guomao
 Chaowai
 Beijing Dongyue Temple
 Sanlitun
 Workers Stadium
 Chaoyang Park
 798 Art Zone
 Olympic Green
 Bird's Nest
 Water Cube
 Digital Beijing Building
 Beijing Olympic Tower
 Wangjing
 Beijing Capital International Airport
 Yabaolu (Yabao Street)

Climate 

Chaoyang District has a humid continental climate (Köppen climate classification Dwa).

References

External links 

 
  

 
Diplomatic districts
Districts of Beijing